The Woman of Yesterday and Tomorrow (German: Die Frau von gestern und morgen) is a 1928 Austrian silent drama film directed by Heinz Paul and starring Arlette Marchal, Vivian Gibson, Livio Pavanelli. It is based on the novel of the same title by Alfred Schirokauer. The film's sets were designed by the art director Hans Ledersteger .

Synopsis
A famous divorce lawyer falls in love with a woman but is reluctant to commit to her because his work has left him so cynical about marriage.

Cast
 Arlette Marchal as 	Hilde von Lobach
 Vivian Gibson as Marya Fjodrowna Jsajeff
 Livio Pavanelli as 	Dr. Röhn - Scheidungsanwalt
 Fritz Alberti as 	Oberst von Lobach
 Igo Sym as Erwin Oven
 Hans Homma	
 Fritz Strassny	
 Viktor Franz		
 Julia Janssen		
 Helene Lauterböck		
 Maria Korten		
 Cornelius Kirschner
 Hermann Frischler
Karl Friedl 	
 Alfred Lohner 
 Wilhelm Völcker 	
 Hermann Benke		
 Anna Kallina

References

Bibliography
 Klapdor, Heike. Mit anderen Augen: Exil und Film. Edition Text & Kritik, 2021.

External links

1928 drama films
Austrian drama films
1928 films
Films directed by Heinz Paul
Austrian silent feature films
Austrian black-and-white films